Vellore Central Prison (established in 1830) is a prison in Vellore, Tamil Nadu, India.

It is the largest jail in the district and 2nd largest in Tamil Nadu after puzhal central prison, Convicts sentenced to imprisonment are confined in the jail from various districts of the Presidency as well as from Burma. Many prisoners sentenced to transpiration by the courts of this Presidency are retained when considered physically unfit for deportation to Andaman. The expenditure in the jail is recovered by the value of the convict labour.

The chief industry carried out in the jail is weaving. A great variety of clothes of various patterns as well as table clothes, gunnies, choir mats, carpets etc. are woven. The central jail is famous for its carpets. The manufacture was first taught to the convicts by a carpet weaver of Ellore. The fabrics are woven and sold in England. Carpentry, shoe making, iron and brass work and tent making are also carried out.

By extreme hard work and good conduct, convicts may earn a remission not exceeding 1/6 of the total period of imprisonment awarded them.

There is a small sub jail attached to the central prison to accommodate the remand and under-trail prisoners of this dist. They will be sent to the concerned courts on the dates under Police Escorts. The prison is protected by a live wiring fence.

People of significance who were imprisoned here include

[†] = died in prison / office

References

1830 establishments in India
Prisons in Tamil Nadu
Vellore